Johane (Jean) Nizeyimana (born 10 May 1993), is a Burundian professional footballer who plays as a forward for FC Chibuto.

Career
Nizeyimana began his professional career with Mozambican side FC de Chibuto. After a season in Mozambique, Nizeyimana signed with top flight Portuguese side Paços de Ferreira in January 2014.

Nizeyimana was loaned out to Segunda Liga side Tondela. He made his debut for the Auriverdes on the 16 February, against Sporting CP B. Nizeyimana would score his first goal for Tondela on the 23 March against Trofense. His loan spell with Tondela, saw him make eight appearances, and score one goal during the process.

Following his loan spell with Tondela, he returned to Paços in the summer of 2014.  Nizeyimana was released by the Pacenses. He subsequently rejoined former team Chibuto following his release from Paços de Ferreira.  He went on to progressively gain momentum in his time back at Chibuto as one of the leading goal scorers.

References

External links 
 Johane Nizeyimana at playmakerstats.com (English version of calciozz.it)
 

1993 births
Living people
Burundian footballers
Association football forwards
F.C. Paços de Ferreira players
Liga Portugal 2 players
Burundian expatriate footballers
Expatriate footballers in Mozambique
Expatriate footballers in Portugal